Military Memorials of National Significance meet a set of ten criteria laid down in the Military Memorials of National Significance Act of 2008 which received assent in the Australian Government on 12 Jul 2008. All such memorials are on public land within a State or the Northern Territory but outside the Australian Capital Territory. The Act allowed memorials outside Canberra to be recognised as National Memorials and the first to receive such recognition was the Australian Ex-Prisoners of War Memorial at Ballarat. The  Member for Ballarat, Catherine King was instrumental in passing this legislation.

 there are eight memorials declared as Military Memorials of National Significance:

Australian Ex-Prisoners of War Memorial, 2008
HMAS Sydney II, 21 May 2009
Shrine of Remembrance, 4 November 2009
ANZAC War Memorial, 23 April 2013
Korean War Memorial in Moore Park, Sydney, 23 April 2013
Sydney Cenotaph, 23 April 2013
Queensland Korean War Memorial, 25 August 2015
Desert Mounted Corps Memorial, July 2015

See also 
 List of Australian military memorials

References

Australian military memorials